The Alaska Systems Coordinating Council (ASCC) formed in 1983, and serves the two isolated interconnections within the State of Alaska. The Alaska Systems Coordinating Council (ASCC) is an affiliate North American Electric Reliability Corporation (NERC) member. 

The ASCC region covers the two grids in the Alaska Interconnection, one of which is in South Central Alaska and the other in the Alaska Panhandle.  Neither of the small grids in ASCC has interties to any other interconnection.

See also
 North American Electric Reliability Corporation (NERC)

References

1983 establishments in Alaska
Electricity in Alaska
Electric power transmission system operators in the United States